The 1975 France rugby union tour of South Africa was a series of matches played by the France national rugby union team in South Africa in May and June 1975. The French team played eleven matches, of which they won six, lost four and drew one. They lost the Test Series 2–0 to the Springboks.

Results
Scores and results list France's points tally first.

Touring party

Manager: M. Batigne
Assistant Managers: Michel Celaya and Fernand Cazenave
Joint Captains: Richard Astre and Jacques Fouroux

Full backs
Jean-Michel Aguirre, Michel Droitecourt, Jean-Pierre Pesteil

Three-quarters
Jean-Charles Amade, Jean-Luc Averous, Christian Badin, Roland Bertranne, Maurice Dupey, Jean-Martin Etchenique, Dominique Harize, Francois Sangali

Half-backs
Jacques Fouroux, Jean-Pierre Romeu
Richard Astre

Forwards
Yves Brunet, Gerard Cholley, Jean Costantino, Jean-Pierre Decrae, Joel Forestlier, Alain Guilbert, Francis Haget, Jean-Luc Joinel, Michel Julian, Serge Lassoujade, Robert Paparemborde, Patrice Peron, Daniel Revaillier, Marc Rousett, Jean-Claude Skrela, Michel Yachvili 

1975 rugby union tours
1975
1975 in South African rugby union
1974–75 in French rugby union
Rugby union and apartheid